Matthieu Brouard was a French theologian, mathematician, philosopher and historian, who was born in Saint-Denis near Paris in 1520, and  died in Geneva on July 15, 1576. He is also known as Matthieu Brouart or Béroalde and (in Latin) as Mattheus Beroaldus.  He taught Greek to the young Thomas Bodley and was the father of François Béroalde de Verville.

References

1520 births
1576 deaths
16th-century French theologians
Theologians from the Republic of Geneva
French mathematicians
16th-century scientists from the Republic of Geneva
French Protestant theologians